The Knowledge Indexes were designed as an interactive tool for benchmarking a country's position vis-a-vis others in the global knowledge economy. It was created by the World Bank Institute using the Knowledge Assessment Methodology (KAM). The World Bank discontinued the index after 2012.  'A joint initiative between the United Nations Development Programme (UNDP) and the Mohammed Bin Rashid Al Maktoum Knowledge Foundation (MBRF)' created 'The Global Knowledge Index (GKI) from Knowledge4All' as a replacement.  An EBRD 'Knowledge Economy Index' documented in a 2019 publication  uses indicators like institutional & legal frameworks (as a basis for patents etc.),  number of technical graduates, research spending number of patents, some measure of collaboration, and amount of venture capital. In total there are 38 contributing indicators described in the ERBD index methodology.

Knowledge Index
The Knowledge Index or KI is an economic indicator prepared by the World Bank Institute to measure a country's ability to generate, adopt and diffuse knowledge. Methodologically, the KI is the simple average of the  normalized performance scores of a country or region on the key variables in three Knowledge Economy pillars - education and human resources, the innovation system and information and communication technology (ICT).

Knowledge Economic Index
The Knowledge Economy Index (KEI) takes into account whether the environment is conducive for knowledge to be used effectively for economic development. It is an aggregate index that represents the overall level of development of a country or region towards the Knowledge Economy. The KEI is calculated based on the average of the normalized performance scores of a country or region on all 4 pillars related to the knowledge economy - economic incentive and institutional regime, education and human resources, the innovation system and ICT.

The 4 pillars of the Knowledge Economy framework
An economic and institutional regime to provide incentives for the efficient use of existing and new knowledge and the flourishing of entrepreneurship;
An educated and skilled population to create, share, and use knowledge well;
An efficient innovation system of firms, research centers, universities, consultants and other organizations to tap into the growing stock of global knowledge, assimilate and adapt it to local needs, and create new technology;
Information and communication technology to facilitate the effective creation, dissemination, and processing of information.

KEI and KI indexes by country

References

[./Http://web.worldbank.org/archive/website01030/WEB/IMAGES/KAM%20V4.PDF http://web.worldbank.org/archive/website01030/WEB/IMAGES/KAM_V4.PDF]

Knowledge economy
World Bank
Economic indicators